Robert Henry Risch (born 1939) is an American mathematician who worked on computer algebra and is known for his work on symbolic integration, specifically the Risch algorithm. This result was quoted as a milestone in the development of mathematics:

He is also known for results on algebraic properties of elementary functions. He received his PhD from University of California, Berkeley in 1968 under the supervision of Maxwell A. Rosenlicht. After his PhD, he worked at the Thomas J. Watson Research Center Mathematics of AI group and, between 1970 and 1972, the Institute for Advanced Study.

References

1939 births
living people
20th-century American mathematicians
University of California, Berkeley alumni
American computer scientists
IBM Research computer scientists
Institute for Advanced Study faculty